Yosemitea is a monotypic genus of flowering plants belonging to the family Brassicaceae. The only species is Yosemitea repanda.

Its native range is Southwestern USA.

References

Brassicaceae